Barbara Greenwood (born September 14, 1940) is a Canadian educator and author of children's books. She has served as president of the Canadian Society of Children's Authors, Illustrators and Performers (CANSCAIP).

Biography
The daughter of George A. Auer and Anne Fisher, she was born Barbara Auer in Toronto. She attended Toronto Teachers College and then received a BA from the University of Toronto. She taught elementary school for a number of years and later taught creative writing in high school and to adult students.

She has been president of CANSCAIP. She also edited a number of books published by CANSCAIP.

Her story "A Major Resolution" received the Vicky Metcalf Short Story Award. She has written short stories and articles for the Canadian Children's Annual and various anthologies.

In 1966, she married Robert E. Greenwood; the couple had four children, including Ed Greenwood, the creator of the Forgotten Realms.

Awards
 Vicky Metcalf Short Story Award

Selected works 
 The CANSCAIP Companion: A Biographical Record of Canadian Children's Authors, Illustrators and Performers (1991)
 A Pioneer Story: The Daily Life of a Canadian Family in 1840 (1995) illustrated by Heather Collins, received a Ruth and Sylvia Schwartz Children's Book Award and a Mr. Christie's Book Award
 The Kids Book of Canada (1997) illustrated by Jock MacRae
 The Last Safehouse: A Story of the Underground Railroad (1998) illustrated by Heather Collins, shortlisted for the Norma Fleck Award, named to the Canadian Children's Book Centre's Our Choice list and included in the Smithsonian's Notable Books for Children

References

External links 

 

1940 births
Living people
Canadian women children's writers
Writers from Toronto
University of Toronto alumni
20th-century Canadian women writers